Requiem is a 2021 British lesbian horror short film directed by Em Gilberston, written by Laura Jayne Tunbridge, and produced by Michelle Brøndum. It stars Bella Ramsey and Safia Oakley-Green.

Synopsis
In 1605, religious conservatism rule parts of England and witch trials are a present danger for nonconformist women. Within this context Evelyn (Ramsey) attempts to evade the wrath of her father, Minister Gilbert (Balcon), to be with her lover, Mary (Oakley-Green).

Cast
Bella Ramsey as Evelyn
Safia Oakley-Green as Mary
Simon Balcon as Minister Gilbert
Sean Buchanan as Minister Shorter
Jack Norris as Matthew Shorter 
Jack Condon as Abe
Juliet Dante as Agnes 
Jason Adam as Josiah

Production
The film was directed by Em Gilbertson and written by Laura Jayne Tunbridge. The film was produced by Michelle Brøndum. Filming took place at the Avoncroft Museum of Historic Buildings in Bromsgrove. The film’s director Em Gilberston told PinkNews of the importance “for all queer people that we don’t forget our history. We have to take lessons from the past to tackle the systemic prejudice still around us and fight for our future”.

Release
In March 2023 the short film was made available to view on the Alter Youtube channel. The film will be shown at the Cleveland Film Festival on March 24, 2023.

Reception
Beatrice Fanucci in Ireland’s GCN described Ramsey’s “heartwrenching performance”. Lyra Hale in Fangirlish discussed how the film was  “beautifully brought to life” by the performances of Ramsey and Oakley-Green.

References

External links

Requiem on YouTube

British drama films
British short films
2020s English-language films
2021 LGBT-related films
British LGBT-related films
LGBT-related drama films
Films shot in Worcestershire